Adron Rahim (born 25 January 1971) is a Trinidadian cricketer. He played in one first-class and one List A match for Trinidad and Tobago in 1990/91.

See also
 List of Trinidadian representative cricketers

References

External links
 

1971 births
Living people
Trinidad and Tobago cricketers